Grivna (гривна) was a currency as well as a measure of weight used in Kievan Rus' and other East Slavic countries since the 11th century.

Name 
In Old East Slavic it had the form  grivĭna. In modern East Slavic languages it has such forms:  grivna,  hryvnia,  hryŭnia.

The name of the contemporary currency of Ukraine, hryvnia, is derived from the ancient grivna.

History

Early period 

As its etymology implies the word originally meant a necklace or a torque. The reason why it has taken the meaning of a unit of weight is unclear. The grivnas that have been found at various archaeological sites are not necklaces but bullions of precious metals, usually silver. The weight and the shape of grivnas were not uniform, but varied by region. The grivnas of Novgorod and Pskov were thin long round-edged or three-edged ingots, while Kievan grivnas have rather the shape of a prolonged rhombus. The material was either gold or silver, but silver was predominant. Originally the weight of a grivna was close to the Roman or Byzantine pound. The Novgorod grivna had the weight  and became the basis for monetary systems of Northeastern Rus' principalities and the emerging Grand Duchy of Moscow.

Along the "grivna of silver" there were the account "grivna of kuna". The latter originally signified a certain amount of marten furs (kuna is the word for marten in slavic languages). Since the 12th century the "grivna of kuna" became another unit of weight, but smaller, and signified as well a certain amount of silver coins: 2.5-gram nogata (from  naqd 'money; a coin') and rezan ( dirham).

1 grivna of silver (204 g) = 4 grivnas of kuna (51 g) = 80 nogata coins = 100 kunas (marten furs) = 200 rezans = 400–600 vekshas (squirrel furs)

Later period 
Since the 14th century, when coins started to be minted in North-Eastern Rus (firstly in Moscow), the currency system of silver bullions and furs was becoming obsolete. The grivna became to mean not a weight but rather a particular number of silver coins called then denga. At the same time as early as the 13th century the word ruble (rubl) started to be used alongside the word grivna to mean a certain amount of either silver or silver coins. Thus one account ruble was equal to 216 denga coins (each weighted about 0.8 gram). The grivna of kuna became simply grivna and was equal to 14 dengas. Thus one ruble was equal to 15 new grivnas and 6 denga coins.

The weight of a denga coin in Moscow and Novgorod was different. In the 15th century the Moscow denga fell as low as 0.4 gram, while the Novgorod denga remained the same. When in Moscow one ruble had been revalued to 200 denga coins, the exchange rate between Moscow and Novgorod denga coins was set to 2 to 1. Thus since the later 15th – the early 16th centuries one account ruble was equal to 100 Novgorod dengas (later known as kopeks) or to 200 Moscow dengas. In this system one grivna was equal to 10 kopeks or 20 dengas.

This last meaning survived into the 18th–20th centuries when one grivennik or grivenka meant a 10-kopek coin.

 Weight 
The grivna as a silver bullion currency did not survive, but its meaning as a unit of weight became predominant. Since the middle of the 17th century the latter became known as the Russian pound (Фунт, funt''). 40 Russian pounds or 80 lesser grivnas (grivenkas) are equal to one pood.

See also 
 Obsolete Russian units of measurement
 Manilla
History of Ukrainian hryvnia

References

Further reading 
 
 

Units of mass
Obsolete units of measurement
Medieval currencies
Society of Kievan Rus'